Beast over Hammersmith is a live album by the British heavy metal band Iron Maiden, released on 4 November 2002. Recorded 20 years previously, during The Beast on the Road tour at the Hammersmith Odeon, the footage was specially co-produced and mixed by Steve Harris and Doug Hall to be a part of the Eddie's Archive box set. Even though this album contains material from The Number of the Beast, it was actually recorded two days prior to its release, although "Run to the Hills" had already been released as a single. The album became officially available for the very first time on vinyl as part of the Number of the Beast 40th anniversary special edition on 18 November 2022.

An abridged video version of the concert is included on the first disc of the 2004 DVD, The History of Iron Maiden – Part 1: The Early Days. Intended to be released on VHS around the time of its recording, the band withheld the footage as they were unhappy with its visual quality due to lighting difficulties during the show.

Track listing

Credits
Production and performance credits are adapted from the album liner notes.

Iron Maiden
Dave Murray – guitar
Bruce Dickinson – vocals
Clive Burr – drums
Steve Harris – bass guitar, co-producer
Adrian Smith – guitar

Production
Doug Hall – co-producer, mixing, engineering
Nick Watson – mastering
Derek Riggs – programme design (cover illustration)
Ross Halfin – photography
Piergiorgio Brunelli – photography
G. Schafer – photography
Toshi Yajima – photography
Andre Csillag – photography
Paul Bertie – photography
Rod Smallwood – photography

Charts

References 

Iron Maiden live albums
2002 live albums
EMI Records live albums
Live heavy metal albums
Albums recorded at the Hammersmith Apollo

no:Eddie's Archive#Beast over Hammersmith